The 2013 M*League Division 1 was the seventh season of top-flight football in Northern Marianas Islands. The Spring League was won by IFC Wild Bills.

League table

References

Marianas Soccer League seasons
North
North
football